Roy Emile Alfredo Innis (June 6, 1934 – January 8, 2017) was an American activist and politician. He was National Chairman of the Congress of Racial Equality (CORE) from 1968 until his death.

One of his sons, Niger Roy Innis, serves as National Spokesman of the Congress of Racial Equality.

Early life
Innis was born in Saint Croix, U.S. Virgin Islands in 1934. In 1947, Innis moved with his mother from the U.S. Virgin Islands to New York City, where he graduated from Stuyvesant High School in 1952. At age 16, Innis joined the U.S. Army, and at age 18 he received an honorable discharge. He entered a four-year program in chemistry at the City College of New York. He subsequently held positions as a research chemist at Vick Chemical Company and Montefiore Hospital.

Early civil rights years
Innis joined CORE's Harlem chapter in 1963. In 1964 he was elected Chairman of the chapter's education committee and advocated community-controlled education and black empowerment. In 1965, he was elected Chairman of Harlem CORE, after which he campaigned for the establishment of an independent Board of Education for Harlem.

In early 1967, Innis was appointed the first resident fellow at the Metropolitan Applied Research Center (MARC), headed by Dr. Kenneth Clark. In the summer of 1967, he was elected Second National Vice-Chairman of CORE.

Additionally that year, Innis became a founding member of the Harlem Commonwealth Council (HCC), a community action agency that has aimed to develop financial and human capital within upper Manhattan and Bronx communities.  The HCC was established under the Economic Opportunity Act of 1964 as part of President Lyndon B. Johnson's War on Poverty campaign.

Leadership of CORE
Innis was selected National Chairman of CORE in 1968 a contentious convention meeting. Innis initially headed the organization in a strong campaign of black nationalism. White CORE activists, according to James Peck, were removed from CORE in 1965, as part of a purge of whites from the movement then under the control of Innis.  Under Innis' leadership, CORE supported the presidential candidacy of Richard Nixon in 1972. This was the beginning of a sharp rightward turn in the organization.

Politics

Innis co-drafted the Community Self-Determination Act of 1968 and garnered bipartisan sponsorship of this bill by one-third of the U.S. Senate and over 50 congressmen. This was the first time in U.S. history that CORE or any civil rights organization drafted a bill and introduced it into the United States Congress.

In the debate over school integration, Innis offered an alternative plan consisting of community control of educational institutions. As part of this effort, in October 1970, CORE filed an amicus curiae brief with the U.S. Supreme Court in connection with Swann v. Charlotte-Mecklenburg Board of Education (1971). 

Innis and a CORE delegation toured seven African countries in 1971. He met with several heads of state, including Kenya's Jomo Kenyatta, Tanzania's Julius Nyerere, Liberia's William Tolbert and Uganda's Idi Amin, who was awarded a life membership of CORE.  Innis met with Amin and the aforementioned African statesmen as part of his CORE campaign drive for finding jobs in Africa for black Americans. In 1973 he became the first American to attend the Organization of African Unity (OAU) in an official capacity.
In 1973, Innis was scheduled to participate in a televised debate with Nobel-winning physicist William Shockley on the topic of black intelligence.  According to sources, Innis pulled out of the debate at the last moment because the student society at Princeton University organizing the event refused to allow the press and the public into the event.  The debate went forward with Dr. Ashley Montagu replacing Innis.

Criminal justice and National Rifle Association
Innis was long active in criminal justice matters, including the debate over gun control and the Second Amendment. After losing two sons to criminals with guns, he became an advocate for the rights of law-abiding citizens to self-defense. A Life Member of the National Rifle Association, he also served on its governing board. Innis also chaired the NRA's Urban Affairs Committee and was a member of the NRA Ethics Committee, and continued to speak publicly in the US and around the world in favor of individual civilian ownership of firearms, gun issues, and individual rights.

Innis lost two of his sons to criminal gun violence. His eldest son, Roy Innis, Jr., was killed at the age of 13 in 1968. His next oldest son Alexander, 26, was shot and slain in 1982.  Innis told Newsday in 1993 "My sons were not killed by the KKK or David Duke. They were murdered by young, black thugs. I use the murder of my sons by black hoodlums to shift the problems from excuses like the KKK to the dope pushers on the streets."

Controversy
Innis was noted for two on-air fights in the middle of TV talk shows in 1988. The first occurred in the midst of an argument about the Tawana Brawley case during a taping of The Morton Downey Jr. Show, when Innis shoved Al Sharpton to the floor. Also that year, Innis was in a scuffle on Geraldo with white supremacist John Metzger. The skirmish started after Metzger, son of White Aryan Resistance founder Tom Metzger, called Innis an "Uncle Tom." Innis grabbed the seated Metzger's throat, appearing to choke him.<ref>{{cite news | url=https://select.nytimes.com/gst/abstract.html?res=FB071FFB3B5C0C778CDDA80994D0484D81 | title=Geraldo Rivera's Nose Broken In Scuffle on His Talk Show | work=New York Times |date=November 4, 1988| access-date = 2010-12-16|quote='I'm sick and tired of Uncle Tom here, sucking up and trying to be a white man, Mr. Metzger said of Mr. Innis, the national chairman of the Congress of Racial Equality. Mr. Innis stood up and began choking the white youth and Mr. Rivera and audience members joined the scuffle, hurling chairs, throwing punches and shouting epithets. 'Racist Thugs Are Like Roaches' }}</ref> The incident started a brawl in the studio, resulting in Rivera's nose getting broken.

Innis raised American volunteers to fight for UNITA, an Angolan rebel army fighting the communist government. UNITA was also supported by Uganda and apartheid-era South Africa.

Prosperity USA, a non-profit run by aides of presidential candidate Herman Cain, attracted controversy after it gave a $100,000 donation to CORE shortly before Cain's speech at a CORE event.

Political campaigns
In 1986, Innis challenged incumbent Major Owens in the Democratic primary for the 12th Congressional District, representing Brooklyn. He was defeated by a three-to-one margin.

In the 1993, New York City Democratic Party mayoral primary, Innis challenged incumbent David Dinkins, the first African-American to hold the office. Given his conservative positions on the issues, he explained that "the Democratic Party is the only game in town. It's unfortunate that we have a corrupt one-party, one ideology system in New York City, and I'd like to change that. But being a Democrat doesn't mean you have to be a fool." During his own campaign, Innis also appeared at fundraising events for the Republican candidate Rudolph Giuliani. Innis received 25% of the vote in the four-way race with a majority of his votes coming from multi-ethnic areas, while he failed in less culturally diverse Assembly Districts. Innis lost to Dinkins, who then lost to Giuliani in the general election.

In February 1994, his son, Niger, who ran his primary campaign, suggested that Innis would also challenge incumbent governor Mario Cuomo in the Democratic primary.

In 1998, Innis joined the Libertarian Party and gave serious consideration to running for Governor of New York as the party's candidate that year. He ultimately decided against running, citing time restrictions related to his duties with CORE.

Innis served as New York State Chair in Alan Keyes's 2000 presidential campaign.

Death
Innis died on January 8, 2017, at the age of 82, from Parkinson's disease.

Bibliography
 Frazier, Nishani (2017). Harambee City: Congress of Racial Equality in Cleveland and the Rise of Black Power Populism''. University of Arkansas Press. .

References

External links
 CORE's Official Website
 A history of Harlem CORE
 
 Harambee City: Archival site incorporating documents, maps, audio/visual materials related to CORE's work in black power and black economic development.

African-American activists
1934 births
2017 deaths
Activists for African-American civil rights
Activists from New York City
American gun rights activists
Right-wing populism in the United States
American people of United States Virgin Islands descent
Deaths from Parkinson's disease
New York (state) Democrats
New York (state) Libertarians
People from Saint Croix, U.S. Virgin Islands
Military personnel from New York City
Politicians from New York City
Stuyvesant High School alumni
Neurological disease deaths in New York (state)
21st-century African-American people
Black conservatism in the United States